James Francis Ivory (born June 7, 1928) is an American film director, producer, and screenwriter. For many years, he worked extensively with Indian-born film producer Ismail Merchant, his domestic as well as professional partner, and with screenwriter Ruth Prawer Jhabvala. All three were principals in Merchant Ivory Productions, whose films have won seven Academy Awards; Ivory himself has been nominated for four Oscars, winning one.

Ivory's directorial work includes A Room with a View (1985), Maurice (1987), Howards End (1992), and The Remains of the Day (1993). For his work on Call Me by Your Name (2017), which he wrote and produced, Ivory won awards for Best Adapted Screenplay from the Academy Awards, British Academy of Film and Television Arts, Writers Guild of America, the Critics' Choice Awards, and the Scripter Awards, among others. Upon winning the Oscar and BAFTA at the age of 89, Ivory became the oldest-ever winner in any category for both awards.

Early life and education
Ivory was born in Berkeley, California, the son of Hallie Millicent (née de Loney) and Edward Patrick Ivory, a sawmill operator. He grew up in Klamath Falls, Oregon. He attended the University of Oregon, where he received a degree in fine arts in 1951. Ivory is a recipient of the Lawrence Medal, UO's College of Design's highest honor for its graduates. His papers are held by UO Libraries' Special Collections and University Archives.

Ivory then attended the University of Southern California School of Cinematic Arts, where he directed the short film Four in the Morning (1953). He wrote, photographed, and produced Venice: Theme and Variations, a half-hour documentary submitted as his thesis film for his master's degree in cinema. The film was named by The New York Times in 1957 as one of the ten best non-theatrical films of the year.  He graduated from USC in 1957.

Career

Merchant Ivory Productions

Ivory met producer Ismail Merchant at a screening of Ivory's documentary The Sword and the Flute in New York City in 1959. In May 1961, Merchant and Ivory formed the film production company Merchant Ivory Productions. Merchant and Ivory were long-term life partners. Their professional and romantic partnership lasted 44 years, from 1961 until Merchant's death in 2005. Ivory owned several homes, including the Jacob Rutsen Van Rensselaer House and Mill Complex in Claverack, New York.

Their partnership has a place in the Guinness Book of World Records for the longest partnership in independent cinema history. Until Merchant's death in 2005, they produced 40 films, including a number of films that received Academy, BAFTA and Golden Globe awards among many others. Ivory directed 17 theatrical films for Merchant Ivory, and novelist Ruth Prawer Jhabvala was the screenwriter for 22 of their productions in addition to another film produced by Merchant Ivory after Merchant's death.

Of this collaboration, Ismail Merchant once commented: "It is a strange marriage we have at Merchant Ivory ... I am an Indian Muslim, Ruth is a German Jew, and Jim is a Protestant American. Someone once described us as a three-headed god. Maybe they should have called us a three-headed monster!"

A Room with a View (1985) 
In 1985, Ivory directed a film adaptation of the classic E. M. Forster novel A Room with a View. The film starred Helena Bonham Carter who was 19 years old at the time, in her first major film role. The film also co-starred Julian Sands, Maggie Smith, Judi Dench, Denholm Elliott, Simon Callow, and Daniel Day-Lewis. The film received universal praise with The Chicago Sun-Times film critic Roger Ebert gave the film four out of four stars, writing: "It is an intellectual film, but intellectual about emotions: It encourages us to think about how we feel, instead of simply acting on our feelings." The film received eight Academy Award nominations including Best Director for Ivory. He also received Best Director nominations from the British Academy Film Awards, the Golden Globes Awards, and the Directors Guild of America.

Maurice (1987) and Mr. and Mrs. Bridge (1990) 
The following year Ivory directed another Forster adaptation, the romantic drama Maurice (1987). The film is a gay love story in the restrictive and repressed culture of Edwardian England. The story follows its main character, Maurice Hall, through university, a tumultuous relationship, struggling to fit into society, and ultimately being united with his life partner. The film stars James Wilby and Hugh Grant in their first major film appearances, and also features Rupert Graves, Simon Callow, Denholm Elliott, Mark Tandy, Billie Whitelaw, Judy Parfitt, Phoebe Nicholls, and Ben Kingsley. In a 2017 retrospective in The New Yorker, Sarah Larson wrote, "...For many gay men coming of age in the eighties and nineties, Maurice was revelatory: a first glimpse, onscreen or anywhere, of what love between men could look like". Director James Ivory has added to the legacy on the film saying, "So many people have come up to me since Maurice and pulled me aside and said, 'I just want you to know you changed my life.'" Ivory won the Venice Film Festival's Silver Lion for Best Director.

This was followed in 1990 by Mr. and Mrs. Bridge, which was adapted by Jhabvala from the novels by Evan S. Connell. According to Ivory, "the world of Mr. and Mrs. Bridge is the world I grew up in...It's the only film I've ever made that was about my own childhood and adolescence." The film received an Oscar nomination for Best Actress (Joanne Woodward), as well two New York Film Critics Circle awards. Ivory would later call Mr. & Mrs. Bridge a personal favorite, adding that it was the one film he would most like to see reappraised.

Howards End (1992) 
In 1992, Merchant-Ivory tackled their third Forster adaptation, Howards End, based on the acclaimed novel and starring Emma Thompson, Helena Bonham Carter, Anthony Hopkins, and Vanessa Redgrave. The film premiered at the 1992 Cannes Film Festival where it competed for the Palme d'Or and went on to critical acclaim. Ivory received his second Academy Award for Best Director nomination. The film also received three Academy Awards for Best Actress (Emma Thompson), Best Adapted Screenplay, and Best Production Design. The film also received eleven British Academy Film Award nominations, and four Golden Globe Award nominations. In 2016, the film was selected for screening as part of the Cannes Classics section at the 2016 Cannes Film Festival, and was released theatrically after restoration on 26 August 2016.

The Remains of the Day (1993) 
The following year, Merchant-Ivory directed the period drama The Remains of the Day (1993), adapted from the acclaimed novel of the same name by Kazuo Ishiguro. American filmmaker Mike Nichols served as one of the film's producers, and the film reunited Anthony Hopkins and Emma Thompson. Supporting performances included James Fox, Christopher Reeve, Hugh Grant, and Lena Headey. The film revolved around a dedicated butler who serves an English landlord in the years leading up to the second World War. The film was a commercial and critical success with Vincent Canby of The New York Times said, in another favorable review, "Here's a film for adults. It's also about time to recognize that Mr. Ivory is one of our finest directors, something that critics tend to overlook because most of his films have been literary adaptations." The film received eight Academy Award nominations with Ivory receiving his third nomination for Best Director. He also received nominations from the British Academy Film Awards, Golden Globe Awards, and Directors Guild of America.

In 1999, the British Film Institute ranked The Remains of the Day the 64th-greatest British film of the 20th century.

Call Me by Your Name (2017) 
In 2017, Ivory wrote and co-produced the film adaptation of Call Me by Your Name, a coming-of-age romantic drama film directed by Luca Guadagnino. Its screenplay is based on the 2007 novel of the same name by André Aciman. The film is the final installment in Guadagnino's thematic "Desire" trilogy, after I Am Love (2009), and A Bigger Splash (2015). Set in 1983 in northern Italy, Call Me by Your Name chronicles the romantic relationship between a 17-year-old, Elio Perlman (Timothée Chalamet), and Oliver (Armie Hammer), a 24-year-old graduate-student assistant to Elio's father (Michael Stuhlbarg), an archaeology professor.

Ivory originally was to co-direct the film based on Guadagnino's suggestion however there was no contract to that effect. Ivory accepted the offer to co-direct on the condition that he would also write the film; he spent "about nine months" on the screenplay. Ivory stepped down from a directorial role in 2016, leaving Guadagnino to direct the film alone. According to Ivory, financiers from Memento Films International did not want two directors involved with the project because they "thought it would be awkward ... It might take longer, it would look terrible if we got in fights on the set, and so on." Guadagnino said Ivory's version would have likely been "a much more costly [and] different film" that would have been too expensive to make. Ivory became the sole-credited screenwriter The film was the only narrative feature he has written but not directed. Despite stepping aside as director, he continued to remain involved with other aspects of the production.

The film was an immense critical success premiering at the Sundance Film Festival, Ivory received many awards and nominations for his screenplay. He was nominated for his fourth Academy Award this time for Best Adapted Screenplay for which he won. He also received the BAFTA Award for Best Adapted Screenplay and Writers Guild of America Award for Best Adapted Screenplay. In 2018 Ivory took part in the film Dance Again with Me Heywood! directed by Michele Diomà.

Filmography
As director

Other credits
 Helen, Queen of the Nautch Girls (1973, short, directed by Anthony Korner) – screenplay
 The Courtesans of Bombay (1983, documentary, directed by Ismail Merchant) – devised
 Call Me by Your Name (2017, film, directed by Luca Guadagnino) – producer, screenplay

Awards and honours

In 1985 A Room with a View was nominated for eight Academy Awards, including Best Picture and Best Director, and won three, for Jhabvala's adaptation of Forster's novel as well as for Best Costume and Best Production Design. A Room With a View was also voted Best Film of the year by the Critic's Circle Film Section of Great Britain, the British Academy of Film and Television Arts, the National Board of Review in the United States and in Italy, where the film won the Donatello Prize for Best Foreign Language Picture and Best Director. In 1987, Maurice received a Silver Lion Award for Best Director at the Venice Film Festival as well as Best Film Score for Richard Robbins and Best Actor Awards for co-stars James Wilby and Hugh Grant. 1990's Mr. and Mrs. Bridge would receive an Oscar nomination for Best Actress (Joanne Woodward), as well as Best Actress and Best Screenplay from the New York Film Critics Circle.

In 1992 Ivory directed another film adapted from Forster, Howards End. The film was nominated for nine Academy Awards, including Best Picture and Best Director, and won three: Best Actress (Emma Thompson), Best Screenplay – Adaptation (Ruth Prawer Jhabvala), and Best Art Direction/Set Decoration (Luciana Arrighi/Ian Whittaker). The film also won Best Picture at the British Academy of Film and Television Arts (BAFTA) Awards, as well as awards for Best Picture, Best Actress for Emma Thompson and Best Director for Ivory from the National Board of Review. The Directors Guild of America awarded the D.W. Griffith award, its highest honor, to Ivory for his work. At the 1992 Cannes Film Festival the film won the 45th Anniversary Prize. Howards End was immediately followed by The Remains of the Day, which was nominated for eight Academy Awards, including Best Picture and Best Director.

For his work in Call Me by Your Name (2017), Ivory received an Academy Award for Best Adapted Screenplay, a Critics' Choice Movie Award for Best Adapted Screenplay, Writers Guild of America Award for Best Adapted Screenplay, BAFTA Award for Best Adapted Screenplay, and USC Scripter Award for Best Screenplay. He was also nominated for the AACTA International Award for Best Screenplay, and the Gotham Independent Film Award for Best Screenplay. At 89, Ivory is the oldest person to ever win an Academy Award in competition.

Bibliography 

 Ivory, James. Solid Ivory: Memoirs. New York: Farrar, Straus and Giroux, 2021. 
--do.-- Autobiography of a Princess: also being the adventures of an American film director in the land of the maharajahs; screenplay by Ruth Prawer Jhabvala. London: John Murray, 1975 ISBN 0-7195-3289-2

See also
List of oldest and youngest Academy Award winners and nominees
List of LGBTQ Academy Award winners and nominees

References

External links
 
 IMP Poster Gallery
 James Ivory at Screen Online
 Biography from Merchant Ivory Productions
 Guide to the James Ivory papers at the University of Oregon

Living people
1928 births
American film producers
American male screenwriters
Best Adapted Screenplay Academy Award winners
Best Adapted Screenplay BAFTA Award winners
Commandeurs of the Ordre des Arts et des Lettres
David di Donatello winners
Film directors from California
Film directors from Oregon
Filmmakers who won the Best Film BAFTA Award
LGBT film directors
LGBT people from California
LGBT people from Oregon
LGBT producers
American LGBT screenwriters
People from Klamath Falls, Oregon
Screenwriters from California
University of Oregon alumni
USC School of Cinematic Arts alumni
Writers from Berkeley, California
Writers from Oregon
Writers Guild of America Award winners